The Morocco men's national tennis team represents Morocco in Davis Cup tennis competition and are governed by the Royal Moroccan Tennis Federation.

Morocco currently compete in the Europe/Africa Zone Group II.

History
Morocco competed in its first Davis Cup in 1961. As of August 2007, the team has played 70 ties; winning 35 and losing 35.

Morocco competes in the Europe/Africa Zone Group II. They last competed in the World Group in 2004 where they lost 5-0 against Argentina.

Current team (2022) 

 Adam Moundir
 Younes Lalami Laaroussi
 Mehdi Benchakroun
 Walid Ahouda
 Yassine Dlimi

See also
Davis Cup
Morocco Fed Cup team

External links

Davis Cup teams
Davis Cup
Davis Cup